John de Wet (born 19 July 1954) is a Zimbabwean judoka. He competed in the men's half-heavyweight event at the 1980 Summer Olympics.

References

1954 births
Living people
Zimbabwean male judoka
Olympic judoka of Zimbabwe
Judoka at the 1980 Summer Olympics
Place of birth missing (living people)